The Johnsonville crater or the Snow's Island crater is a circular geophysical feature situated at the junction of the Lynches River and the Pee Dee River in South Carolina, United States, which has been interpreted by some scientists as an impact crater. Snow's Island, at that point, is believed to be the upthrust formed at the center of the crater after the impact. It was discovered by magnetic anomalies, supported by the study of well drilling cores. Supposed impact breccia was found in these cores. The Russian Academy of Sciences lists the structure as a proven impact crater, though the Earth Impact Database (EID) does not list it as confirmed.

References

Citations

General bibliography

External links 
 An Impact Crater in Northeast South Carolina
 The Johnsonville Impact Crater, South Carolina: Petrologic Evidence of Shock Metamorphism from Core Samples, The Smithsonian/NASA Astrophysics Data System

Eocene impact craters
Impact craters of the United States
Landforms of Florence County, South Carolina
Possible impact craters on Earth